The Uzbekistan Ice Hockey Federation (UIHF) (OXF, Ўзбекистон хоккей федерацияси, ОХФ) is the governing body of ice hockey in Uzbekistan.

History
The Uzbekistan Ice Hockey Federation was founded on 28 March 2018, and was later accepted into the International Ice Hockey Federation (IIHF) on 26 September 2019, the fourth former Soviet Republic from Central Asia to join the IIHF after Kazakhstan, Kyrgyzstan and Turkmenistan. The current president of the UIHF is Bakhtiyor Fazilov.

See also
Uzbekistan Hockey League on Russian Wikipedia
Uzbekistan national ice hockey team

References

External links
Official website 
IIHF profile
Newly established Ice Hockey Federation of Uzbekistan to hold a gala show
HOCKEY IN UZBEKISTAN. BEGINNING.

Uzbekistan
Ice hockey in Uzbekistan
International Ice Hockey Federation members
Ice
Sports organizations established in 2018